"", also known as "", is the national anthem of Senegal. It was adopted in 1960.

Development 
The lyrics were written by Léopold Sédar Senghor, who became Senegal's first president. The music is composed by the French composer Herbert Pepper, who also composed the national anthem of the Central African Republic, "".  The kora (a type of harp) and balafon (wooden xylophone) are Senegalese musical instruments.

References

External links
 Senegal: Pincez Tous vos Koras, Frappez les Balafons - Audio of the national anthem of Senegal, with information and lyrics

National anthems
Senegalese songs
National symbols of Senegal
1960 songs
African anthems
National anthem compositions in E-flat major